The 1954–55 Hong Kong First Division League season was the 44th since its establishment.

League table

References
1954–55 Hong Kong First Division table (RSSSF)

Hong Kong First Division League seasons
Hong
football